The 2019 Women's FA Cup Final (known as the SSE Women's FA Cup Final for sponsorship reasons) was the 49th final of the Women's FA Cup, England's primary cup competition for women's football teams. The showpiece event was the 26th to be played directly under the auspices of the Football Association (FA).

The final was contested between Manchester City and West Ham United on 4 May 2019 at Wembley in London. It was Manchester City's second appearance in the final of the Women's FA Cup having won the 2017 final. It was the first FA Cup final for West Ham United and also their first appearance at the national stadium.

Manchester City won the game with three second-half goals from Keira Walsh, Georgia Stanway and Lauren Hemp to record their second Women's FA Cup victory in three seasons. The result meant that City went through the entire FA Cup campaign without conceding a goal, and completed their first domestic cup double.

Route to the final

Manchester City 
Manchester City were one of 22 WSL and Championship teams to enter the competition in the fourth round proper and were drawn against National League team Watford. Substitute Nikita Parris finally broke the deadlock in the 62nd minute, the first of her two goals on the day as City won 3–0. City traveled to Championship side Tottenham Hotspur for the fifth round, securing a second consecutive 3–0 victory in the competition before repeating the result once again in the quarter-finals, this time against WSL opposition as Georgia Stanway scored a second half brace following Janine Beckie's opener against Liverpool to secure Manchester City a semi-final place for the fourth season in a row. Manchester City were drawn against familiar opposition for the semi-final in Chelsea: it was the fifth time in six seasons the teams had met in the FA Cup, with the previous three also occurring at the semi-final stage. Chelsea had emerged victorious on all four of the previous occasions including the previous season on the way to winning the trophy. Despite controlling the game and creating more chances, a freak own goal by Magdalena Eriksson in the 90+2nd minute knocked the defending champions out by a scoreline of 1–0 meaning City had also successfully negotiated all four rounds without conceding a goal.

West Ham United 
West Ham United were one of 22 WSL and Championship teams to enter the competition in the fourth round proper and were drawn against National League team Blackburn Rovers. The third division team took the lead through Natasha Flint before the Hammers equalised on the stroke of half-time through Adriana Leon. Brianna Visalli put West Ham ahead after the break before Canadian international Leon scored her second goal of the game to secure a 3–1 victory. For the fifth round, West Ham were drawn at home to third division opposition for the second consecutive time in Huddersfield Town. The visitors once again took the lead as captain Kate Mallin buried a 14th minute penalty into the top corner but Alisha Lehmann leveled eight minutes later. By half-time, West Ham were leading 4–1 and scored another four in the second half including a hat-trick by Leanne Kiernan to eventually win out emphatic 8–1 victors. Jane Ross scored the only goal of a 1–0 quarter-final win over Championship side Aston Villa to send West Ham through to the team's semi–final appearance. With only WSL teams left in the final four, West Ham finally met first division opposition for the first time in the competition as they traveled to Reading in the semi-finals. After a goalless first half, Rachel Furness put the home side ahead in the 49th minute. Just like in the fifth round, West Ham found an equaliser through Alisha Lehmann eight minutes later. With the teams locked at 1–1 after extra-time, the tie was eventually settled in a penalty shoot-out. 3–3 after five penalties each, the shoot-out entered sudden death: Anna Moorhouse saved Reading captain Jade Moore's weak attempt before South Korean international Cho So-hyun stepped up and stroked the ball into the top corner to book the Hammers' place at Wembley. The latter portion of West Ham's FA Cup run featured heavily in the BBC behind-the-scenes documentary Britain's Youngest Football Boss.

Pre-match
West Ham asked the Premier League that their men's fixture against Southampton at the London Stadium be moved from a 15:00 kick-off to 12:30 so fans attending that match could also make it to Wembley to watch the final. The request was denied by the Premier League.

Match

Details

References

External links
 

Cup
Women's FA Cup finals
Women's FA Cup Final
Women's FA Cup Final
FAC 2019
West Ham United W.F.C. matches